Callindra similis is a moth of the family Erebidae. It was described by Frederic Moore in 1879. It is found in India (Sikkim), Nepal, Bhutan and China (Yunnan, Tibet, Sichuan).

References

Callimorphina
Moths described in 1879